Rudolf I (1 May 1218 – 15 July 1291) was the first King of Germany from the House of Habsburg. The first of the count-kings of Germany, he reigned from 1273 until his death.

Rudolf's election marked the end of the Great Interregnum which had begun after the death of the Hohenstaufen Emperor Frederick II in 1250. Originally a Swabian count, he was the first Habsburg to acquire the duchies of Austria and Styria in opposition to his mighty rival, the Přemyslid king Ottokar II of Bohemia, whom he defeated in the 1278 Battle on the Marchfeld. The territories remained under Habsburg rule for more than 600 years, forming the core of the Habsburg monarchy and the present-day country of Austria. Rudolf played a vital role in raising the comital House of Habsburg to the rank of Imperial princes.

Early life 
Rudolf was born on 1 May 1218 at Limburgh Castle near Sasbach am Kaiserstuhl in the Breisgau region of present-day southwestern Germany. He was the son of Count Albert IV of Habsburg and Hedwig, daughter of Count Ulrich of Kyburg. Around 1232, he was given as a squire to his uncle, Rudolf I, Count of Laufenburg, to train in knightly pursuits.

Count of Habsburg 

At his father's death in 1239, Rudolf inherited from him large estates  around the ancestral seat of Habsburg Castle in the Aargau region of present-day Switzerland as well as in Alsace. Thus, in 1240, in order to quell the rising power of Rudolf and in an attempt to place the important "Devil’s Bridge" across the  under his direct control, Emperor Frederick II granted Schwyz Reichsfreiheit in the Freibrief von Faenza.

In 1242, Hugh of Tuffenstein provoked Count Rudolf through contumelious expressions. In turn, the Count of Habsburg had invaded his domains, yet failed to take his seat of power. As the day passed on, Count Rudolf bribed the sentinels of the city and gained entry, killing Hugh in the process. Then in 1244, to help control Lake Lucerne and restrict the neighboring forest communities of Uri, Schwyz and Unterwalden, Rudolf built near its shores Neuhabsburg Castle. In 1245 Rudolf married Gertrude, daughter of Count Burkhard III of Hohenberg. He received as her dowry the castles of Oettingen, the valley of Weile, and other places in Alsace, and he became an important vassal in Swabia, the former Alemannic German stem duchy. That same year, Emperor Frederick II was excommunicated by Pope Innocent IV at the Council of Lyon. Rudolf sided against the Emperor, while the forest communities sided with Frederick. This gave them a pretext to attack and damage Neuhabsburg. Rudolf successfully defended it and drove them off. As a result, Rudolf, by siding with the Pope, gained more power and influence.

Rudolf paid frequent visits to the court of his godfather, the Hohenstaufen emperor Frederick II, and his loyalty to Frederick and his son, King Conrad IV of Germany, was richly rewarded by grants of land. In 1254, he engaged with other nobles of the Staufen party against Bertold II, Bishop of Basle. When night fell, he penetrated the suburbs of Basle and burnt down the local nunnery, an act for which Pope Innocent IV excommunicated him and all parties involved. As a penance, he took up the cross and joined Ottokar II, King of Bohemia in the Prussian Crusade of 1254. Whilst there, he oversaw the founding of the city of Königsberg, which was named in memory of King Ottokar.

Rise to power 
The disorder in Germany during the interregnum after the fall of the Hohenstaufen dynasty afforded an opportunity for Count Rudolf to increase his possessions. His wife was a Hohenberg heiress; and on the death of his childless maternal uncle Count Hartmann IV of Kyburg in 1264, Rudolf seized Hartmann's valuable estates. Successful feuds with the Bishops of Strasbourg and Basel further augmented his wealth and reputation, including rights over various tracts of land that he purchased from abbots and others.

These various sources of wealth and influence rendered Rudolf the most powerful prince and noble in southwestern Germany (where the tribal Duchy of Swabia had disintegrated, enabling its vassals to become completely independent). In the autumn of 1273, the prince-electors met to choose a king after Richard of Cornwall had died in England in April 1272. Rudolf's election in Frankfurt on 1 October 1273, when he was 55 years old, was largely due to the efforts of his brother-in-law, the Hohenzollern burgrave Frederick III of Nuremberg. The support of Duke Albert II of Saxony and Elector Palatine Louis II had been purchased by betrothing them to two of Rudolf's daughters.

As a result, within the electoral college, King Ottokar II of Bohemia (1230–1278), himself a candidate for the throne and related to the late Hohenstaufen king Philip of Swabia (being the son of the eldest surviving daughter), was almost alone in opposing Rudolf. Other candidates were Prince Siegfried I of Anhalt and Margrave Frederick I of Meissen (1257–1323), a young grandson of the excommunicated Emperor Frederick II, who did not yet even have a principality of his own as his father was still alive. By the admission of Duke Henry XIII of Lower Bavaria instead of the King of Bohemia as the seventh Elector, Rudolf gained all seven votes.

King of the Germans

Rudolf was crowned in Aachen Cathedral on 24 October 1273. To win the approbation of the Pope, Rudolf renounced all imperial rights in Rome, the papal territory, and Sicily, and promised to lead a new crusade by taking the crusader's vow in 1275. Pope Gregory X, despite the protests of Ottokar II of Bohemia, not only recognised Rudolf himself, but persuaded King Alfonso X of Castile (another grandson of Philip of Swabia), who had been chosen German (anti-)king in 1257 as the successor to Count William II of Holland, to do the same. Thus, Rudolf surpassed the two heirs of the Hohenstaufen dynasty whom he had earlier served so loyally.

In November 1274, the Imperial Diet at Nuremberg decided that all Crown estates seized since the death of the Emperor Frederick II must be restored, and that King Ottokar II must answer to the Diet for not recognising the new king. Ottokar refused to appear or to restore the duchies of Austria, Styria and Carinthia together with the March of Carniola, which he had claimed through his first wife, a Babenberg heiress, and which he had seized while disputing them with another Babenberg heir, Margrave Hermann VI of Baden. Rudolf refused to accept Ottokar's succession to the Babenberg patrimony, declaring that the provinces reverted to the Imperial crown due to the lack of male-line heirs. King Ottokar was placed under the imperial ban; and in June 1276 war was declared against him.

Having persuaded Ottokar's former ally Duke Henry XIII of Lower Bavaria to switch sides, Rudolf compelled the Bohemian king to cede the four provinces to the control of the royal administration in November 1276. Rudolf then re-invested Ottokar with the Kingdom of Bohemia, betrothed one of his daughters to Ottokar's son Wenceslaus II, and made a triumphal entry into Vienna. Ottokar, however, raised questions about the execution of the treaty, and procured the support of several German princes, again including Henry XIII of Lower Bavaria. To meet this coalition, Rudolf formed an alliance with King Ladislaus IV of Hungary and gave additional privileges to the Viennese citizens. On 26 August 1278, the rival armies met at the Battle on the Marchfeld, where Ottokar was defeated and killed. The Margraviate of Moravia was subdued and its government entrusted to Rudolf's representatives, leaving Ottokar's widow Kunigunda of Slavonia in control of only the province surrounding Prague, while the young Wenceslaus II was again betrothed to Rudolf's youngest daughter Judith.

Rudolf's attention next turned to the possessions in Austria and the adjacent provinces, which were taken into the royal domain. He spent several years establishing his authority there but found some difficulty in establishing his family as successors to the rule of those provinces. At length, the hostility of the princes was overcome. In December 1282, at the Hoftag (imperial diet) in Augsburg, Rudolf invested his sons, Albert and Rudolf II, with the duchies of Austria and Styria and so laid the foundation of the House of Habsburg. Additionally, he made the twelve-year-old Rudolf Duke of Swabia, a merely titular dignity, as the duchy had been without an actual ruler since Conradin's execution. The 27-year-old Duke Albert, married since 1274 to a daughter of Count Meinhard II of Gorizia-Tyrol (1238–95), was capable enough to hold some sway in the new patrimony.

In 1286, King Rudolf fully invested Albert's father-in-law Count Meinhard with the Duchy of Carinthia, one of the conquered provinces taken from Ottokar. The Princes of the Empire did not allow Rudolf to give everything that was recovered to the royal domain to his own sons, and his allies needed their rewards too. Turning to the west, in 1281 he compelled Count Philip I of Savoy to cede some territory to him, then forced the citizens of Bern to pay the tribute that they had been refusing. In 1289 he marched against Count Philip's successor, Otto IV, compelling him to do homage.

In 1281, Rudolf's first wife died. On 5 February 1284, he married Isabella, daughter of Duke Hugh IV of Burgundy, the Empire's western neighbor in the Kingdom of France.

Rudolf was not very successful in restoring internal peace. Orders were indeed issued for the establishment of territorial peaces in Bavaria, Franconia and Swabia, and at the Synod of Würzburg in March 1287 for the whole Empire. But the king lacked the power, resources, and determination to enforce them, although in December 1289 he led an expedition into Thuringia, where he destroyed a number of robber castles. In 1291, he attempted to secure the election of his son Albert as German king. The electors refused, however, claiming inability to support two kings, but in reality, perhaps, wary of the increasing power of the House of Habsburg. Upon Rudolf's death they elected Count Adolf of Nassau.

Persecution of the Jews 
In 1286, Rudolf I instituted a new persecution of the Jews, declaring them servi camerae ("serfs of the treasury"), which had the effect of negating their political freedoms. Along with many others, Rabbi Meir of Rothenburg, perhaps the greatest rabbi of the time, left Germany with family and followers, but was captured in Lombardy and imprisoned in a fortress in Alsace. Tradition has it that a large ransom of 23,000 marks silver was raised for him (by the Rosh), but Rabbi Meir refused it, for fear of encouraging the imprisonment of other rabbis. He died in prison after seven years. Fourteen years after his death a ransom was paid for his body by Alexander ben Shlomo (Susskind) Wimpfen, who was subsequently laid to rest beside the Maharam.

Death 

Rudolf died in Speyer on 15 July 1291 and was buried in Speyer Cathedral. Only one of his sons survived him: Albert I. Most of his daughters outlived him, apart from Catherine who had died in 1282 during childbirth and Hedwig who had died in 1285/6.

Rudolf's reign is most memorable for his establishment of the House of Habsburg as a powerful dynasty in the southeastern part of the realm. In the other territories, the centuries-long decline of Imperial authority since the days of the Investiture Controversy continued, and the princes were largely left to their own devices.

In the Divine Comedy, Dante finds Rudolf sitting outside the gates of purgatory with his contemporaries, characterizing him as "he who neglected that which he ought to have done".

Family and children 
Rudolf was married twice. First, in 1251, to Gertrude of Hohenberg and second, in 1284, to Isabelle of Burgundy. All children were from the first marriage.
Matilda (c. 1253, Rheinfelden – 23 December 1304, Munich), married 1273 in Aachen to Duke Louis II of Bavaria and became mother of Duke Rudolf I of Bavaria and Emperor Louis IV
 Albert I of Germany (July 1255 – 1 May 1308), Duke of Austria and also of Styria
 Catherine (1256 – 4 April 1282, Landshut), married 1279 in Vienna to Duke Otto III of Bavaria
 Agnes [Gertrude] (ca. 1257 – 11 October 1322, Wittenberg), married 1273 to Duke Albert II of Saxony and became the mother of Duke Rudolf I of Saxe-Wittenberg
 Hedwig (c. 1259 – 26 January 1285/27 October 1286), married 1270 in Vienna to Margrave Otto VI of Brandenburg-Salzwedel and left no issue
 Clementia (c. 1262 – after 7 February 1293), married 1281 in Vienna to Charles Martel of Anjou, the papal claimant to the throne of Hungary
 Hartmann (1263, Rheinfelden – 21 December 1281), drowned in Rheinau
 Rudolf II, Duke of Austria and Styria (1270 – 10 May 1290, Prague), titular Duke of Swabia, father of John the Parricide of Austria
 Judith (13 March 1271 – 18 June 1297, Prague), married 24 January 1285 to King Wenceslaus II of Bohemia and became the mother of King Wenceslaus III of Bohemia, Poland and Hungary
 Samson (before 19 Oct 1275 – died young)
 Charles (14 February 1276 – 16 August 1276)

See also 
 Kings of Germany family tree

References

Citations

Bibliography

External links

 Encyclopedia of Austria

1218 births
1291 deaths
13th-century dukes of Austria
13th-century Kings of the Romans
German monarchs
People temporarily excommunicated by the Catholic Church
Christians of the Prussian Crusade
Rudolf 1
Rudolf 1
Austrian expatriates in Germany
People from the Duchy of Swabia
Burials at Speyer Cathedral
1270s in the Holy Roman Empire
1280s in the Holy Roman Empire
13th-century House of Habsburg
Swabian nobility